Sonali Deraniyagala (born 1964) is a Sri Lankan memoirist and economist. She currently serves as a lecturer in Economics at the SOAS South Asia Institute. She considers Joan Didion and Michael Ondaatje her favourite literary heroes.

Personal life
Born in Colombo, Sri Lanka,

She married economist Stephen Lissenburgh, and while on vacation at Sri Lanka's Yala National Park in December 2004, she lost her two sons, husband, parents, best friend, and her best friend's mother in the Indian Ocean tsunami. The tsunami carried her two miles inland and she was able to survive by clinging to a tree branch. She reportedly suffered unconsciousness and internal bleeding. Following the tsunami, she was taken to her aunt's house in Colombo. At her aunt's house, stayed beneath the covers of her cousin’s bed, hoarding sleeping pills for comfort and solace, she even went onto stab herself with a butter knife and even smashed her head on the sharp corner of the wooden headboard of the bed in reaction to the disbelief of what she had witnessed during her vacation in Sri Lanka. She even attempted to commit suicide and also began drinking alcohol in a bid to forget the tragedy.

She went to New York at the end of 2006 and began a new life post the traumatic 2004 December tsunami indicating something similar to witness-protection-programme life. After moving to New York, she chose a small apartment in Greenwich Village and her move to New York was an accident as she never intended to do so in first place. She was convinced by her therapist who suggested her to write down her painful memories to make her relax from the trauma. She began writing her memories in a form of memoir at her apartment in Greenwich Village.

She started dating the actress Fiona Shaw in 2018 after years of dating men only, the couple got married after Sonali proposed to her a few months later. They had their first child in October 2021.

Career 
She studied economics at Cambridge University and has a doctorate from the University of Oxford. She is on the faculty of the Department of Economics at SOAS, University of London and is a research scholar at Columbia University in New York City. She lives in New York City, and London.

Post the tsunami, Deraniyagala relocated to New York where she became a visiting research scholar at Columbia University. Her 2013 memoir, Wave, recounts her experiences in the tsunami and the progression of her grief in the ensuing years. Sonali began writing her memoir Wave in 2010, where she described about her personal experiences aftermath the tsunami and how she coped up with it. The book became an instant hit and much to Sonali's surprise, it became one of the most sought-after memoirs globally. It was shortlisted for the 2013 National Book Critics Circle Award (Autobiography) and won the PEN Ackerley Prize 2013. This book is currently used as a prose passage in the education system (O/Level) for English Literature in Sri Lanka.

She has also expressed her concerns, insights and opinions about the 2019–present Sri Lankan economic crisis to various platforms.

References

1964 births
Living people
Alumni of the University of Cambridge
Alumni of the University of Oxford
Columbia University faculty
Women memoirists
People from Colombo
Sri Lankan economists
Sinhalese writers
Sri Lankan women scientists
20th-century Sri Lankan writers
20th-century Sri Lankan women writers
21st-century Sri Lankan writers
21st-century Sri Lankan women writers
Bisexual women
Bisexual memoirists
Bisexual scientists
Sri Lankan LGBT people